Baby Makes Five is an American sitcom television series starring Peter Scolari. The series premiered April 1, 1983 on ABC.

Plot

Cast
Peter Scolari as Eddie Riddle
Louise Williams as Jennie Riddle
Andre Gower as Michael Riddle
Jenny Lewis as Laura Riddle
Brandy Gold as Annie Riddle
Janis Paige as Blanche Riddle
Priscilla Morrill as Edna Kearney

US TV Ratings

Episodes

References

External links

1980s American sitcoms
1983 American television series debuts
1983 American television series endings
American Broadcasting Company original programming
English-language television shows
Television series by Alan Landsburg Productions
Television shows set in New York City